Joseph Pitt (1759–1842) was a British lawyer of humble origins who prospered as a property speculator, notably in Cheltenham, Gloucestershire, but also in Wiltshire, and who served as a Tory MP for Cricklade, Wiltshire 1812–1831. His name is commemorated in Pittville, Cheltenham, his largest speculative development.

References

Members of the Parliament of the United Kingdom for English constituencies
UK MPs 1812–1818
UK MPs 1818–1820
UK MPs 1820–1826
UK MPs 1826–1830
UK MPs 1830–1831
1759 births
1842 deaths
Members of Parliament for Cricklade